 

The Door Is Still Open to My Heart is a 1964 studio album by Dean Martin, produced by Jimmy Bowen and featuring arrangements by Ernie Freeman, Gus Levene and Marty Paich.

Three of the songs from the album, ("I'm Gonna Change Everything," "The Middle of the Night Is My Cryin' Time," and "My Sugar's Gone") had previously featured on Martin's 1963 album Dean "Tex" Martin Rides Again.

The Door Is Still Open to My Heart peaked at number 9 on the Billboard 200. "Send Me the Pillow You Dream On," which went into the Top 20 of the pop charts and the Top 5 of the easy listening chart.

"You're Nobody till Somebody Loves You" was released as a single from the album and was a Top 40 hit for Martin, and his third song to top the Easy Listening charts.

Reception

William Ruhlmann on AllMusic gave the album three stars out of five and commented that aside from the songs newly recorded for the album, "the resulting lineup fit for the most part into the "hit plus filler" formula of albums assembled mainly for people who didn't like to buy 45s."

Track listing

Personnel 
 Dean Martin – vocals
 Ernie Freeman - arranger
 Gus Levene
 Marty Paich
 Jimmy Bowen - producer
 Phil Stern - photography

References 

1964 albums
Dean Martin albums
Albums arranged by Ernie Freeman
Albums arranged by Marty Paich
Albums produced by Jimmy Bowen
Reprise Records albums